The fourth season of the television series Dallas aired on CBS during the 1980–81 TV season.

Cast

Starring
In alphabetical order:
 Barbara Bel Geddes as Miss Ellie Ewing (23 episodes)
 Jim Davis as Jock Ewing (21 episodes)
 Patrick Duffy as Bobby Ewing (23 episodes)
 Linda Gray as Sue Ellen Ewing (23 episodes)
 Larry Hagman as J.R. Ewing (23 episodes)
 Steve Kanaly as Ray Krebbs (23 episodes)
 Ken Kercheval as Cliff Barnes (23 episodes)
 Victoria Principal as Pamela Barnes Ewing (23 episodes)
 Charlene Tilton as Lucy Ewing Cooper (22 episodes)

Also starring
 Leigh McCloskey as Mitch Cooper (20 episodes)
 Susan Howard as Donna Culver Krebbs (19 episodes)
 Susan Flannery as Leslie Stewart (11 episodes)
 Mary Crosby as Kristin Shepard (7 episodes)
 Randolph Powell as Alan Beam (1 episode)

Special guest stars
 Monte Markham as Clint Ogden (9 episodes)
 William Smithers as Jeremy Wendell (8 episodes)
 Priscilla Pointer as Rebecca Barnes Wentworth (6 episodes)
 Anne Francis  as Arliss Cooper (4 episodes)
 E.J. André as Eugene Bullock (2 episodes)
 Joanna Cassidy as Sally Bullock (2 episodes)
 Howard Keel as Clayton Farlow (2 episodes)
 John Lehne as Kyle Bennett (2 episodes)

Notable guest stars
Jared Martin returns as Steven "Dusty" Farlow, and long-running supporting actors Morgan Woodward (Punk Anderson), Tyler Banks (John Ross Ewing III), Audrey Landers (Afton Cooper), Deborah Tranelli (Phyllis Wapner) and Laurence Haddon (Franklin Horner) all appear for the first time. Additionally, William Windom appears in two episodes as Amos Krebbs who knows the truth about Ray's real father. Joel Fabiani (Alex Ward) appears in several episodes, but won't return for subsequent seasons, and Christopher Stone (Dave Stratton) appear in four episodes and will later return for season 8. Ted Shackelford and Joan Van Ark  (Gary and Valene Ewing) cross over from Dallas spinoff Knots Landing for three and two episodes, respectively.

Crew
The season's episode writers include showrunner Leonard Katzman, the returning Arthur Bernard Lewis, Linda B. Elstad, Loraine Despres, and Rena Down, and as well as new additions Robert J. Shaw, Leah Markus, Howard Lakin, Louis Elias, and David Paulsen. Philip Capice continues to serve as sole executive producer, as Lee Rich, left the show after the previous season. Katzman serves as producer, and Cliff Fenneman as associate producer. Arthur Bernard Lewis continues as executive story editor, with Camille Marchetta, Rena Down, and Robert J. Shaw serving as story editors.

DVD release
Dallas season four was released by Warner Bros. Home Video, on a Region 1 DVD box set of four double-sided DVDs, on January 24, 2006. In addition to the 23 episodes, it also includes the cast reunion special Dallas Reunion: The Return to Southfork which originally aired on CBS on November 7, 2004.

Knots Landing

The Dallas cast continued to make occasional appearance in spinoff series Knots Landing, which was on its second year: J.R. (Larry Hagman) appeared in A Family Matter (airing on January 22, 1981) and Designs (March 26, 1981); Bobby (Patrick Duffy) in The Loudest Word (February 19, 1981); and Kristin (Mary Crosby) in Kristin (December 18, 1980, her only Knots Landing appearance).

Episodes

References

External links
 List of Dallas season 4 episodes at the Internet Movie Database

1980 American television seasons
1981 American television seasons
Dallas (1978 TV series) seasons